The Journal of the Adventist Theological Society (JATS) is an American refereed scholarly Christian journal published by the Adventist Theological Society, an adventist group. It is issued twice a year from Collegedale, Tennessee.

History and operations
The first issue was published in 1990.

In 1996, its circulation was around 10,000, the "great majority" of which were distributed freely.

As well as Adventist readership, copies are distributed to every member of the Evangelical Theological Society, nearly 2,000 in total.

See also 

 Andrews University Seminary Studies
 List of Seventh-day Adventist periodicals
 List of theology journals

References

External links 
 JATS Journal Online Archive

1990 establishments in Tennessee
Academic journals published by learned and professional societies of the United States
Biannual journals
English-language journals
Hamilton County, Tennessee
Publications established in 1990
Christianity studies journals
Seventh-day Adventist periodicals
Mass media in Tennessee